Ipotești is a commune in Olt County, Muntenia, Romania. It is composed of a single village, Ipotești. This was part of Milcov Commune until 2004, when it was split off.

References

Communes in Olt County
Localities in Muntenia